In the United Kingdom, confidence motions are a means of testing the support of the government (executive) in a legislative body, and for the legislature to remove the government from office. A confidence motion may take the form of either a vote of confidence, usually put forward by the government, or a vote of no confidence (or censure motion), usually proposed by the opposition. When such a motion is put to a vote in the legislature, if a vote of confidence is defeated, or a vote of no confidence is passed, then the incumbent government must resign, or call a general election.

It is a fundamental principle of the British constitution that the government must retain the confidence of the legislature, as it is not possible for a government to operate effectively without the support of the majority of the people's representatives. At the national level, this means that the UK government (the cabinet) must retain the confidence of a majority in the House of Commons.

It is possible for a vote of no confidence to succeed where there is a minority government or a small majority, or where there are internal party splits leading to some members of the ruling party voting against its leaders. Where there is a minority government, the government may seek agreements or pacts with other parties in order to prevail in the vote and remain in office.

Despite their importance to the constitution, for a long time the rules surrounding motions of no confidence were dictated solely by convention. Under the Fixed-term Parliaments Act 2011, a vote of no confidence had to be passed in a specific form in order to create the possibility of an early general election. Under the Act, if a motion of no confidence in the government was passed in express terms, the house must then adopt a vote of confidence in that same or an alternative government within 14 days, or a general election be held. These practices were ended in 2022, with the repeal of the 2011 Act.

A no-confidence vote was last successfully used on 28 March 1979, when the minority government of James Callaghan was defeated. A no-confidence vote can have the effect of uniting the ruling party; for this reason such motions are rarely used and successful motions are even rarer. Before 1979 the last successful motion of no confidence occurred in 1924. The most recent confidence vote instigated by the opposition was held on 16 January 2019, with the government prevailing.

Defeat of a motion of no confidence (or winning a vote of confidence) does not provide protection to the government in power for any specific length of time. MPs from any political party may propose another vote immediately, although are unlikely to do so due to convention and potential weakening of their own standing.

Forms
Since 1945 there have been three votes of confidence and 23 of no confidence.

Confidence motions fall into three categories:
 Explicit motions initiated by the Government
 Explicit motions initiated by the Opposition
 Motions which can be regarded as issues of confidence because of particular circumstances.

Government
A motion in this category is often effectively a threat of dissolution by the government, in order to persuade backbench MPs to support a bill. One such threat occurred in 1993 so that John Major could pass the Social Chapter of the Maastricht Treaty. In 2022, the outgoing government of Boris Johnson called a vote of confidence in itself after rejecting the wording of a proposed opposition motion that had signalled no confidence in both the government and Johnson's leadership specifically.

Opposition
Opposition motions are initiated by the opposition party and often have little chance of success. By convention, a no-confidence vote takes precedence over normal Parliamentary business for that day, and will begin with speeches from the Prime Minister and the Leader of the Opposition, rather than the ministers for the policy area which may be the concern of the motion. The motion may either profess no confidence in the Government itself, or no confidence in the particular policies of a government. Probably the most famous no-confidence motion was on the night of 28 March 1979 when Jim Callaghan's Labour Government fell from office by one vote, 311–310, in what was described by the BBC as one of the most dramatic nights in Westminster's history.

Particular circumstances
Although there is no commonly accepted and comprehensive definition of a confidence motion, it is possible to identify confidence motions from their timing, the speakers and the terms of the motion. Motions of confidence are supportive of the government whereas motions of no confidence are unsupportive of the government. It can be difficult to distinguish an opposition no-confidence motion from other opposition motions critical of Government policy. The term censure motion can also refer to a category of motion which does not attempt to remove the government.

List of no-confidence votes

Successful votes before 1940

Votes since 1940 
The list below includes all confidence motions since 1945 and some between 1940 and 1945. Government-defeated motions are noted in bold.

Constitutional practice

Before 2011 and after 2021
If a government wins a confidence motion they are able to remain in office. If a confidence motion is lost then the Government is obliged to resign or seek a dissolution of Parliament and call a General Election. Although this is a convention, prior to the 2011 Fixed-term Parliaments Act there was no law which requires that the Government resign or call a General Election. Modern practice shows dissolution rather than resignation to be the result of a defeat. The government is only obliged to resign if it loses a confidence vote, although a significant defeat on a major issue may lead to a confidence motion.

During the period 1945–1970 Governments were rarely defeated in the House of Commons and the impression grew that if a Government was defeated it must reverse the decision, seek a vote of confidence, or resign.

Brazier argues: "it used to be the case that a defeat on a major matter had the same effect as if an explicit vote of confidence had carried" but that a development in constitutional practice has occurred since the 1970s. Thatcher's defeat over the Shops Bill 1986 did not trigger a confidence motion despite being described as 'a central piece of their legislative programme'. The government simply accepted that they could not pass the bill and gave assurances to Parliament that they would not introduce it.

After a defeat on a major issue of government policy the Government may resign, dissolve Parliament, or seek a vote of confidence from the House. Recent historical practice has been to seek a vote of confidence from the House. John Major did this after defeat over the Social Protocol of the Maastricht Treaty. Defeats on minor issues do not raise any constitutional questions.

A proposed motion of no confidence can force a resignation. For example, in 2009 the proposed vote of no confidence in the Speaker of the House of Commons forced the resignation of Michael Martin in the wake of the Parliamentary Expenses Scandal. Several MPs breached a constitutional convention and openly called for the resignation of the Speaker.

2011 – 2022 

Under the Fixed-term Parliaments Act 2011, a passing of a motion of no confidence was one of only two ways in which an early election can occur (the other is a motion to hold an early election passed by at least two-thirds of MPs). Following a successful motion, Parliament must dissolve, unless the motion was overturned within 14 days by the passing of an explicit motion of confidence. This procedure was designed to allow a minority government time to seek the support of other parties (as a formal coalition or with a confidence and supply arrangement) to avoid having to face re-election, or to allow an alternative government to be formed.

In principle, the alternative government could be led by any MP who can draw together enough support for a legislative programme that secures a vote of confidence and, by convention, a request from the monarch to form such a government.  In practice, it was likely to be the leader, or a senior member, of a party with a significant number of MPs in the House that can achieve this.  In turn, they could be expected to bring about an early election using the two-thirds of MPs provision of the Fixed-Term Act to gain a popular mandate for their programme.

The only such motion under the 2011 Act was tabled on 15 January 2019, following the defeat of Theresa May's Brexit deal, and was voted on the following day. May won the vote.

See also
Motion of no confidence
Constitution of the United Kingdom
Dissolution of the Parliament of the United Kingdom
Lascelles Principles – relating to the sovereign's power to dissolve Parliament

Notes

References

Bibliography

 
Parliament of the United Kingdom